The Block Pramukh (president) of Panchayat samiti is a tier of the Panchayati raj system.
It is a rural local government body at the Tehsil (taluka) level in India. It works for the villages of the tehsil that together are called a development block. The Panchayat Samiti is the link between the gram panchayat (village council) and the zila parishad (district board). There are a number of variations in the name of this institution in the various states. For example, it is known as Kshetra Panchayat in Uttar Pradesh, Mandal Parishad in Andhra Pradesh, Taluka Panchayat in Gujarat, Block Panchayat in Kerala and Mandal Panchayat in Karnataka.

Block Pramukh (president) are Panchayats at the Apex or District Level in Panchayat Raj Institutions (or PRIs).

The 73rd Amendment is about Rural Local Governments (which are also known as Panchayati Raj Institutions or PRIs)
 Panchayat at District(or apex) Level
 Panchayat at Intermediate Level
 Panchayat at Base Level

Composition 

Typically, a panchayat samiti is composed of elected members of the area, and the Block Development Officer, otherwise unrepresented members (representatives of Scheduled Castes and Scheduled Tribes and women), associate members (such as a farmer of the area, a representative of the cooperative societies, and one from the agricultural marketing services sector), and the elected members of that panchayat block (tehsil) on the zila parishad (district board).

The samiti is elected for five years and is headed by a Block Pramukh(President) elected by the members of the panchayat samiti.

Departments 
The most common departments found in a panchayat samiti are:

 Administration
 Finance
 Public works (especially water and roads)
 Agriculture
 Health
 Education
 Social welfare
 Information Technology
 Women & Child Development
 Panchayat raj ( Mandal Praja Parishad )

Each department in a panchayat samiti has its own officer, most often these are state government employees acting as extension officers, but occasionally in more revenue-rich panchayat samiti, these may be local employees. A government appointed block development officer (BDO) is the supervisor of the extension officers, and executive officer to the panchayat samiti and becomes, in effect, its administrative chief over all operations.

Functions 
Panchayat Samiti collects all the prospective plans prepared at Gram Panchayat level and processes them for funding and implementation by evaluating them from the angles of financial constraints, social welfare and area development. It also identifies and prioritize the issues which needs to be addressed at block level.

Sources of income 
The income of the panchayat samiti comes from four sources:
 taxes levied upon land and water usage, professional taxes, liquor taxes and others
 income generating programmes
 grants-in-aid and loans from the State Government and the local zila parishad
 voluntary contributions

For many of the panchayat samiti the main source of income becomes state aid. For others, the traditional taxing function provides the bulk of revenues.  Tax revenues are often shared between the gram panchayats and the panchayat samiti.

References

External links
 Block Pramukh Election UP 2021

Panchayati raj (India)